JMP may refer to:

 JMP (statistical software), a statistical analysis application by SAS Institute, Inc.
 JMP (x86 instruction)
 Joint Monitoring Programme for Water Supply and Sanitation, a program by WHO and UNICEF to monitor a particular Millennium Development Goal
 UC Berkeley – UCSF Joint Medical Program
 The Journeyman Project, a 1992 game series from Presto Studios
 Joint Meeting Parties, a coalition of opposition political parties in Yemen
 Joshua Moufawad-Paul, Canadian Maoist
 JMP.chat, an XMPP to SMS gateway service